Afognak (Alutiiq: Agw’aneq) is an island in the Kodiak Archipelago  north of Kodiak Island in the U.S. state of Alaska. The coast is split by many long, narrow bays.

The dense spruce forests of Afognak are home to Kodiak bears, Roosevelt elk, and Sitka black-tailed deer. Many people visit the island recreationally for hunting and fishing.

History

The United States Census of 1890 noted a series of settlements along the beachline near the Alutiiq village of Ag’waneq (also called Afognak), including Rutkovsky village, inhabited by a group of retired employees of the Russian-American Company.

Ag’waneq was abandoned after the 1964 Good Friday earthquake devastated the island. The descendants of the Alaska Native inhabitants of the island are officially recognized as the Native Village of Afognak. Most of them now live in Port Lions or Kodiak.

In the early 21st century, there are a few small logging camps and fishing lodges on the island. A community of Russian Old Believers live at Aleneva. The economy is based on subsistence and logging. Transportation is provided by float plane from Kodiak to various areas around the island. The 2000 census reported a population of 169 persons.

References

Afognak Island: Blocks 2009 and 2010, Census Tract 1, Kodiak Island Borough, Alaska United States Census Bureau

External links 
Alaska Department of Fish and Game island map
Alaska Community Database - Afognak

Islands of the Kodiak Archipelago
Old Believer communities in the United States
Russian-American culture in Alaska